Punyamurthula is an Indian surname. Notable people with the name include:

 Ananth Babu (born Punyamurthula Ananth), Indian film actor and comedian
 Chitti Babu (Telugu actor) (born Punyamurthula Suryanarayana Murthy), Indian film actor and comedian
 Raja Babu (actor) (born Punyamurthula Appalaraju; 1937–1983), Indian film actor and comedian

Surnames of Indian origin